Modern paganism, also known as "contemporary" or "neopagan", encompasses a wide range of religious groups and individuals. These may include old occult  groups, those that follow a New Age approach, those that try to reconstruct old ethnic religions, and followers of the pagan religion or Wicca.

Early movements 

Pre-World War II neopagan or proto-neopagan groups, growing out of occultism and/or Romanticism (Mediterranean revival, Viking revival, Celtic revival, etc.).
 Neo-druidism
 Ancient Order of Druids (1781)
 The Druid Order (1909)
 Hermetic Order of the Golden Dawn (1888)
 Crowleyan Thelema (1904)
 Germanic neopaganism/Armanism
 Germanische Glaubens-Gemeinschaft (1907)
 Guido von List Society (1908)
 Church of the Universal Bond (1912)
 Adonism (1925)

Ethnic and cultural 

 European Congress of Ethnic Religions

Germanic 

Heathenism (also Heathenry, or Greater Heathenry), is a blanket term for the whole Germanic neopagan movement. Various currents and denominations have arisen over the years within it. Some of these denominations follow white supremacy, and some of the groups listed here follow folkish ideology.
 Europe
 Scandinavia
 Íslenska Ásatrúarfélagið (1972)
 Samfundet Forn Sed Sverige (1994)
 Åsatrufellesskapet Bifrost (1996)
 Forn Sed Norge (1998)
 Samfälligheten för Nordisk Sed (1999)
 United Kingdom
 Odinic Rite (1973)
 Odinist Fellowship (United Kingdom) (1988)
 Asatru UK (2013)
 German-speaking Europe
 Artgemeinschaft (1951)
 Heidnische Gemeinschaft (1985)
 Deutsche Heidnische Front (1998)
 Eldaring (2000)
 Latin-speaking Europe
 Odinist Community of Spain – Ásatrú (1981)
 Russian-speaking world
 Dark Ashtree community
 North America
 Heathenry in the United States
 Asatru Free Assembly (Stephen McNallen, 1974–1986)
 Ásatrú Alliance (1987)
 Ring of Troth (1987)
 Asatru Folk Assembly (1996)
 Odinist Fellowship (United States) (Else Christensen, 1971–2005)
 Odinic Rite (1973)
 Ásatrú Alliance (1987)
 Odin Brotherhood
 Wotansvolk
 Heathenry in Canada

Celtic

 Celtic Reconstructionist Paganism (1980s)
 Neo-druidism or neodruidry, or druidism or druidry
 Dynion Mwyn (1950s/60s)
 Reformed Druids of North America (1963)
 Order of Bards, Ovates and Druids (1964)
 Monastic Order of Avallon (1970)
 Ár nDraíocht Féin (1983)

Italic
 Italo-Roman neopaganism or Religio Romana
 Nova Roma
 Roman Traditional Movement

Hellenic 

 Hellenism

Baltic

 Dievturība (Latvian)
 Community of Latvian Dievturi (1926–early 1930s)
 Congregation of Latvian Dievturi (1927–1940)
 Latvian Church Dievturi (1971)
 Congregation of Latvian Dievturi (1990)
 Lithuanian neopaganism (Romuva)

Slavic

 Rodnovery (Native Faith) (1920–30s)
 Zadruga (1937)
 Rodzima Wiara (1996)
 Native Ukrainian National Faith, RUNVira (1964)
 Peterburgian Vedism
 Union of the Veneds (1986)
 Skhoron ezh Sloven (1991)
 Slavic-Hill Rodnovery (1980s)
 Ynglism (1991)
 Native Polish Church (1995)
 Union of Slavic Native Belief Communities (1997)
 Rodnover Confederation (2015)
 Commonwealth of Pagan Communities of Siberia–Siberian Veche (2015)
 Ivanovism (1930s)
 Tezaurus Spiritual Union (Authentism) (1984)
 Russian Public Movement "Course of Truth and Unity" (Concept of Public Security "Dead Water") (1985)
 Bazhovism (1992)
 Kandybaism or Russian Religion (1992)
 Ringing Cedars' Anastasianism (1997)
 Levashovism or Russian Public Movement of Renaissance–Golden Age (2007)

Uralic

 Estonian neopaganism (Taaraism and Maausk)
 Maavalla Koda (1995)
 Finnish neopaganism
 Hungarian neopaganism
 Mari native religion
 Mordvin native religion
 Udmurt Vos

Caucasian

 Abkhaz neopaganism
 Council of Priests of Abkhazia (2012)
 Adyghe Habze
 Vainakh religion

Other European

 Armenian Native Faith (Hetanism)
 Assianism (Ossetian Native Faith)
 Zalmoxianism

Turko-Mongolic

 Aar Aiyy Faith (1996)
 Aiyy Faith, former Kut-Siur (1990)
 Aiyy Tangara Faith (2019)
 Burkhanism/Ak Jang (1904)
 International Fund of Tengri Research (2011)
 Mongolian shamanism/Tengerism
 Heaven's Dagger
 Mongolian Shamans' Association (Golomt Tuv)
 Circle of Tengerism (Mongolian shamanic association of America)
 Golomt Center for Shamanist Studies
 Samgaldai Center
 Tengir Ordo (2005)
 Vattisen Yaly
 Chuvash National Congress (1989–1992)
 Chuvash Traditional Faith Organization "Tura" (1995)

Canarian
 Church of the Guanche People

Semitic
 Semitic neopaganism

Kemetic
 Kemetism
 Kemetic Orthodoxy

American
 Ausar Auset Society (1973)
 Mexicayotl
 Native American Church (late 19th century)

African
 Godianism (1948)

Wicca 

Wicca originated in 1940s Britain and became the mainstream of neopaganism in the United States in the 1970s. There are two core traditions of Wicca which originated in Britain, Gardnerian and Alexandrian, which are sometimes referred to as British Traditional Wicca. From these two arose several other variant traditions. Wicca has also inspired a great number of other traditions in Britain, Europe and the United States, most of which base their beliefs and practices on Wicca. Many movements are influenced by the Movement of the Goddess, and New Age and feminist worldviews.

 British Traditional Wicca
 Gardnerian Wicca (1954)
 Alexandrian Wicca (1967)
 Central Valley Wicca (1969)
 Algard Wicca (1972)
 Chthonioi Alexandrian Wicca (1974)
 Blue Star Wicca (1975)
 Greencraft Wicca (1993)
 Eclectic Wicca and Inclusive Wicca
 Celtic Wicca
 Saxon Wicca
 Dianic Wicca
 McFarland Dianic Wicca
 Faery Wicca
 Georgian Wicca
 Odyssean Wicca
 Wiccan church
 New Reformed Orthodox Order of the Golden Dawn (1968)
 Church and School of Wicca (1968)
 Circle Sanctuary (1974)
 Covenant of the Goddess (1975)
 Aquarian Tabernacle Church (1979)
 Rowan Tree Church (1979)
 Covenant of Unitarian Universalist Pagans (1985)
 NorthWind Tradition of American Wicca (1988)
 Coven of the Far Flung Net (1998)

Other Wiccan-related traditions
 Stregheria (Italian tradition)
 Hedge Witchcraft
 Cochrane's Craft
 1734 Tradition
 Children of Artemis
 Feri Tradition
 Reclaiming

New Age, eclectic or syncretic 

 Antinous
 Church of All Worlds
 Church of Aphrodite
 Christian Wicca
 Feraferia
 Goddess movement
 Huna
 Neoshamanism
 Pagan Federation
 Radical Faeries
 Universal Pantheist Society

See also 
 List of modern pagan temples
 List of pagans
 Secular paganism

References

External links 
 BBC Paganism Portal

 
Modern pagan traditions
Neopagan